Heidi Suzanne Cruz (née Nelson; born August 7, 1972) is an American businesswoman. She has been a managing director at Goldman Sachs since 2012.

Cruz completed her tertiary education at Claremont McKenna College, the Université libre de Bruxelles, and Harvard Business School. She was an economic policy adviser to George W. Bush's 2000 presidential campaign and subsequently held various positions in the Bush Admistration, including as an advisor to the Treasury Department and National Security Council. In 2005 she joined Goldman Sachs as a private wealth manager.

In 2001, she married future U.S. Senator Ted Cruz, with whom she has two daughters. In his 2016 presidential campaign, she took a leave of absence to work as his primary fundraiser and surrogate.

Early and personal life
Heidi Suzanne Nelson was born on August 7, 1972, in San Luis Obispo, California, to Suzanne Jane (née Rouhe), a dental hygienist, and Peter Christian Nelson, a dentist. Nelson was raised as a Seventh-day Adventist. Her maternal grandfather Olavi Johannes Rouhe was from Savonlinna, Finland. During a part of Nelson's childhood, she lived with her family in Kenya, Nigeria, and throughout Asia, where they served as missionaries, while both parents participated in dental health work. Nelson became interested in business as a child, and sold homemade bread with her brother, Scott.

Nelson attended Valley View Adventist Academy in Arroyo Grande, near her home town of San Luis Obispo. She completed her secondary education in 1990, at Monterey Bay Academy, an Adventist boarding school about 150 miles north in La Selva Beach, California. Following high school, Nelson attended Claremont McKenna College, graduating Phi Beta Kappa with a BA in Economics and International Relations in 1994. While attending the school, she was active in the student Republican group. While at Claremont McKenna, she studied abroad at the University of Strasbourg. In 1995, she received a Masters of European Business degree from Solvay Brussels School of Economics and Management of the Université libre de Bruxelles in Brussels, Belgium. Her second graduate degree was an MBA from Harvard Business School in 2000.

Subsequent to getting married in 2001, Cruz moved from Washington D.C. to Texas in 2004, and experienced a period of depression as a result of the transition. Cruz and her husband have two daughters, Caroline and Catherine. Since 2011, she characterizes herself as the primary breadwinner of the family. Cruz converted to the Southern Baptist denomination, though she still maintains a vegetarian diet in adherence with her Adventist upbringing.

During the 2021 Texas power crisis, she and her family decided to vacation in Cancún, Mexico; Cruz reportedly messaged friends and neighbors to propose a stay at the Ritz-Carlton, partly on the grounds that the nightly rate was attractive. Cruz's messages and her role in the vacation placed her at the center of an international scandal; in addition to leaving the state during a period of crisis, the Cruzes came under fire for traveling internationally both during the COVID-19 pandemic and during the deadly storm, thereby violating official government guidelines, the guidelines of the school where their daughters are enrolled, and Ted Cruz's own public recommendations.

Career 
In 2000, Nelson worked as an economic policy director on the Bush for President campaign, where she met her future husband Ted Cruz. Following her marriage to Ted Cruz in 2001, she went on to work for the Bush administration; she began as a top deputy to U.S. Trade Rep. Robert Zoellick, focusing on economic policy. Cruz worked as director of the Latin America desk at the Department of Treasury in 2002. She taught herself how to speak Spanish between jobs.

In 2003, Cruz reported directly to National Security Advisor Condoleezza Rice. Cruz eventually became the director for the Western Hemisphere on the National Security Council where she "had Rice's ear." During a New York Times interview, Cruz recalled enjoying her tenure with the Bush administration and found her work to be "personally fulfilling." That year, she delivered the commencement address for the graduating class of Tennessee's Southern Adventist University. After commuting between Washington, D.C. and her husband's home state of Texas for a year, she moved to Texas in 2004, where she briefly worked for Merrill Lynch. She has previously worked for JPMorgan Chase.  In 2005, she began working for Goldman Sachs as a private wealth manager.

From 2005 to 2011, she was an active member of the Council on Foreign Relations and was a member of the Independent Task Force on North America that in 2005, published a report entitled "Building a North American Community." Cruz sits on the Board of Directors for the Greater Houston Partnership. After seven years at Goldman Sachs, Cruz was promoted in 2012, to regional head of the Southwest United States for the Investment Management Division in Houston. In 2019, the Trump Administration interviewed Cruz as a finalist for the position of president of the World Bank.

Role in 2016 presidential campaign 

Cruz took a leave of absence without pay to participate in her husband's 2016 presidential campaign. During the campaign, she made multiple solo public appearances, speaking on her husband's behalf. Former George W. Bush administration official Sara Taylor Fagen said she was successful in softening her husband's image, which she further argued was essential for "a candidate whose main obstacle to the Republican nomination may be tone and personality", though director of the SuperPAC Our Principles PAC Katie Packer argued her help could only go so far and voters would not support a candidate based on their spouse.

Early campaigning 
Early in her husband's campaign, Cruz's initial role was that of fundraiser, making calls to potential donors, seeking to "max out" investments to the Cruz campaign. Cruz's call list included donor names provided to her by a super PAC. Campaign chairman Chad Sweet compared Cruz's ability to make campaign calls to her time at Goldman Sachs, stating, "There are very few spouses who can get on the phone on a cold call to a prospective donor and make a more compelling case in a personal and effective way than Heidi Cruz."

Beginning in August 2015, Cruz regularly attended presidential debates in which her husband participated. When asked what her role would be as First Lady, she expressed an intent to raise "the standard of living for those at the bottom of the economic ladder in this country", explaining that her interests are on "the economic side". During a two-day trip to Alabama in November 2015, she delivered signatures and payment required for her husband to appear on that state's ballot at the Alabama Republican Party headquarters in Hoover.

On December 3, Cruz returned to Texas to file paperwork for her husband's name to appear on the state ballot. She acknowledged she had previously filed for his name on ballots in previous states, but also said the Cruz campaign had "a campaign strategy that's built to last, and we have built a grass-roots army that this country hasn't seen since Ronald Reagan." Having made televised solo appearances on Fox Business Network, and KTRK-TV, it was noted by Patrick Svitek of The Texas Tribune that she had become more visible in the previous months than she had been before.

Primaries 
Cruz stumped for her husband in Iowa ahead of the 2016 Republican caucuses, appearing in the state multiple times. Ted Cruz ultimately won the state, which she believed was due to "one strong voice of the people coming together". For New Hampshire, another early primary state, it was reported in January that she would make stops there to rally support for her husband. In February, Cruz was reported to be headlining a luncheon for Republican women in Reno, Nevada, days before the state's primary.

Cruz's campaigning in Texas was viewed by commentators (including potential voters) as essential to her husband's winning of his home state on Super Tuesday.  
At the time of her campaigning in Texas, Ted Cruz was expected to win the state, the move being seen as the Cruz campaign not wanting to take any chances. According to Cruz, both she and her husband were confident about his prospects of winning. She emphasized the state as both her and her husband's home state. After Super Tuesday, Cruz herself subsequently campaigned independently in North Carolina, Illinois, and Missouri. She then substituted for her husband in Fayetteville, North Carolina, speaking at Fayetteville Technical Community College in promotion of him, and jointly appeared with her husband in Wisconsin. Weeks before the state primaries, Cruz appeared in Indiana. Ted Cruz dropped out of the primary after a loss in Indiana to Donald Trump on May 3, 2016.Prior to dropping out, Cruz was involved in a Twitter feud with Donald Trump after he retweeted a composite image of an unflattering photo of Heidi next to a photo of Melania Trump, captioning it with "No need to ‘spill the beans.’ The images are worth a thousand words.”

Notes

References

External links 

 

Living people
1972 births
American investment bankers
American money managers
California Republicans
Christian vegetarianism
Claremont McKenna College alumni
Former Seventh-day Adventists
George W. Bush administration personnel
Goldman Sachs people
Harvard Business School alumni
JPMorgan Chase people
Merrill (company) people
Businesspeople from Houston
People from San Luis Obispo, California
Southern Baptists
Ted Cruz
Texas Republicans
University of Strasbourg alumni
Women in finance
American people of Finnish descent
Spouses of Texas politicians
21st-century American businesswomen
21st-century American businesspeople